Cariappa is a surname from Kodagu district, Karnataka in South India. It is found among Hindus of the Kodava community.

Notable people

The following is a list of notable people with last name Cariappa.

 K. M. Cariappa (1899–1993), first Indian commander-in-chief of the Indian Army
 K. C. Cariappa (born 1938), former Air Officer in the Indian Air Force and K. M. Cariappa's son
 K. C. Cariappa (cricketer) (born 1994), Indian cricketer

Indian surnames
Karnataka society